Drago Hedl (born 24 January 1950) is a Croatian investigative journalist.

Drago Hedl was born in Osijek and became a professional journalist in 1980.

He was an Editor-in-Chief of Glas Slavonije, an Osijek-based daily, from 1986 to 1991, and a war correspondent for Slobodna Dalmacija, a Split-based daily, from 1991 to 1994. Following that, he joined IWPR's London-based War Report and then spent several years leading training programs for young journalists throughout the Balkan region. Hedl later wrote for Feral Tribune, and Novi list. Hedl was a long-time collaborator of Radio Free Europe. His articles were published by many newspapers and magazines, among them The Guardian, The Times and Die Wochenzeitung (Zurich).

In 2008 he became an investigative journalist for the Zagreb-based daily Jutarnji list.

Hedl is best known for his investigative work for Feral Tribune and from 2008 for Jutarnji list in uncovering war crimes during the Croatian War of Independence. This earned him a 2006 Knight International Journalism Award from the International Center for Journalists, the CEI-SEEMO Investigative Journalism Award by the Central European Initiative in 2008 and a 2011 Dr. Erhard Busek Award for Better Understanding in South East Europe from the South East Europe Media Organisation. He was also the recipient of the Order of Stjepan Radić in 2011 for his "contribution to the fight for human rights, the promotion of democracy and the discovery of truth" and the Otokar Keršovani Prize from the Croatian Journalists' Association for Lifetime Achievement in Journalism in 2015.

"Drago Hedl has endured death threats, government litigation, beatings by local politicians and army soldiers, among others, and verbal abuse for his reporting of war crimes in Yugoslavia in the 1990s. His struggle against ultra-nationalism, wartime propaganda and hate speech, and for tolerance and the rule of law, has led to accusations of treason. His support for complying with demands to send indicted war criminals to the International Criminal Tribunal for the former Yugoslavia in The Hague has further provoked his opponents. Nothing, however, has deterred him from solid and objective coverage of a sensitive topic in his homeland."

Hedl has written seven books and has been the scriptwriter for three films, including Vukovar – poslednji rez (Vukovar – Final Cut), a 2006 documentary film about the Battle of Vukovar. His book, Glavaš – kronika jedne destrukcije (2010), an account of the involvement of warlord and politician Branimir Glavaš in war crimes in Osijek, has been very favorably received.

Hedl has been married for eight years to Ivana, a fellow journalist, and has one son, Matija. He holds a bachelor's degree in Yugoslav literature.

References

External links

Drago Hedl 
Čemu se smijemo nadati 
Promocija knjiga o Glavašu i Gotovini 
Drago Hedl: Strah je najstarija emocija, starija od ljubavi 

1950 births
Croatian journalists
People from Osijek
Investigative journalists
Living people
Faculty of Humanities and Social Sciences, University of Zagreb alumni